Etruscan history is the written record of Etruscan civilization compiled mainly by Greek and Roman authors. Apart from their inscriptions, from which information mainly of a sociological character can be extracted, the Etruscans left no surviving history of their own, nor is there any mention in the Roman authors that any was ever written. Remnants of Etruscan writings are almost exclusively concerned with religion.

Origin

There are two main hypotheses as to the origins of the Etruscan civilization in the Early Iron Age: either by autochthonous development in situ out of the Villanovan culture of Etruria in central Italy, or via oriental (Anatolian) colonization of Italy. 
Helmut Rix's classification of the Etruscan language in a proposed Tyrsenian language family reflects this ambiguity. He finds Etruscan on one hand genetically related to the Rhaetic language spoken in the Alps north of Etruria, suggesting autochthonous connections, but on the other hand the Lemnian language found on the "Lemnos stele" is closely related to Etruscan, entailing either Etruscan presence in "Tyrsenian" Lemnos, or "Tyrsenian" expansion westward to Etruria. The Etruscan language was of a different family from that of neighbouring Italic and Celtic peoples, who spoke Indo-European languages.

Modern archaeologists have come to suggest that the history of the Etruscans can be traced relatively accurately, based on the examination of burial sites, artifacts, and writing. A separate Etruscan culture distinguishable from that of the possibly ancestral Villanovan people emerged in the beginning of the 8th century BC, evidenced by the inscriptions in a script similar to that used for Euboean Greek. The burial tombs, some of which had been fabulously decorated, promotes the idea of an aristocratic city-state, with centralized power structures maintaining order and constructing public works, such as irrigation networks, roads, and town defenses.

History

Etruscan expansion was focused both to the north beyond the Apennines and south into Campania. Some small towns disappeared during the 6th century BC, ostensibly consumed by greater, more powerful neighbors. However, there is no doubt that the political structure of the Etruscan culture was similar, albeit more aristocratic, to Magna Graecia in the south.

The mining and commerce of metal, especially copper and iron, led to an enrichment of the Etruscans and to the expansion of their influence in the Italian peninsula and the western Mediterranean sea. Here, their interests collided with those of the Greeks, especially in the 6th century BC, when Phoceans of Italy founded colonies along the coast of France, Catalonia and Corsica. This led the Etruscans to ally themselves with the Carthaginians, whose interests also collided with the Greeks.

Military history

Around 540 BC, the Battle of Alalia led to a new distribution of power in the western Mediterranean Sea. Though the battle had no clear winner, Carthage managed to expand its sphere of influence at the expense of both the Etruscans and the Greeks. Etruria saw itself relegated to the northern Tyrrhenian Sea.

From the first half of the 5th century BC, Campanian Etruria lost its Etruscan character, and the new international political situation meant the beginning of the Etruscan decline. In 480 BC, Etruria's ally Carthage was defeated by a coalition of Magna Graecia cities led by Syracuse. A few years later, in 474, Syracuse's tyrant Hiero defeated the Etruscans at the Battle of Cumae. Etruria's influence over the cities of Latium and Campania weakened, and it was taken over by Romans and Samnites.

In the 4th century BC, Padanian Etruria saw a Gallic invasion end its influence over the Po valley and the Adriatic coast.

Roman–Etruscan Wars

In the 4th century BC, Rome began annexing Etruscan cities. By the beginning of the 1st century BC, Rome had annexed all the remaining Etruscan territory.

Rulers

The institution of kingship was general. Many names of individual Etruscan kings are recorded, most of them in a historical vacuum, but with enough chronological evidence to show that kingship persisted in Etruscan city-culture long after it had been overthrown by the Greeks and at Rome, where Etruscan kings were long remembered with suspicion and scorn. When the last king was appointed, at Veii, the other Etruscan cities were alienated, permitting the Romans to destroy Veii. It is presumed that Etruscan kings were military and religious leaders. The paraphernalia of Etruscan kingship is familiar because it was inherited by Rome; they adopted the symbols of the republican authority wielded by the consuls: the purple robe, the staff or scepter topped with an eagle, the folding cross-framed "curule seat", the sella curulis, and most prominent of all, the fasces carried by a magistrate, which preceded the king in public appearances.

The Etruscan cities would come together under a single leader at a traditional annual council held at the sacred grove of the Fanum Voltumnae. The precise site of this meeting is unknown, but the search has exercised scholars since the Renaissance. In times of no emergency, the position of praetor Etruriae, as Roman inscriptions express it, was no doubt largely ceremonial and concerned with cultus.

Rulers of Clusium
 Osiniu fl. probably early 11th century BC
 Lars Porsena fl. late 6th century BC
 Aruns fl. c. 500 BC

Rulers of Caere
 Lausus
 Larthia
 Thefarie Velianas fl. c. late 6th century–early 4th century BC, known from his temple dedication recorded on the Pyrgi Tablets

Rulers of Veii
 Volumnius fl. mid 5th century–437 BC
 Lars Tolumnius fl. late 5th century–428 BC

Rulers of Arimnus
 Arimnestos

Etruscan kings of Rome
 Lucius Tarquinius Priscus (616–579)
 Servius Tullius (578–535)
 Lucius Tarquinius Superbus (535–510/509) BC

Other Etruscan rulers
 Mezentius fl. c. 1100 BC
 Tyrsenos
 Velsu fl. 8th century BC

Notes

Further reading

Bartoloni, Gilda. "The Villanovan culture: at the beginning of Etruscan history." In The Etruscan World, edited by Jean MacIntosh Turfa, 79–98. Abingdon: Routledge, 2013. 
Briquel, Dominique. "Etruscan origins and the ancient authors." In The Etruscan World, edited by Jean MacIntosh Turfa, 36–55. Abingdon: Routledge, 2013.
De Grummond, Nancy Thomson. Etruscan Myth, Sacred History, and Legend. Philadelphia: University of Pennsylvania Museum of Archaeology and Anthropology, 2006.
Haynes, Sybille. Etruscan Civilization: A Cultural History. Los Angeles: J. Paul Getty Museum, 2000.
Jolivet, Vincent. "A long twilight: 'Romanization' of Etruria." In The Etruscan World, edited by Jean MacIntosh Turfa, 151–79. Abingdon: Routledge, 2013.
Leighton, Robert. "Urbanization in southern Etruria from the tenth to the sixth century BC: the origins and growth of major centers." In The Etruscan World, edited by Jean MacIntosh Turfa, 134–50. Abingdon: Routledge, 2013. 
Nielsen, Marjatta. "The Last Etruscans: family tombs in northern Etruria." In The Etruscan World, edited by Jean MacIntosh Turfa, 180–93. Abingdon: Routledge, 2013. 
Potter, T.W. Roman Italy. Berkeley: University of California Press, 1987.
Sannibale, Maurizio. "Orientalizing Etruria." In The Etruscan World, edited by Jean MacIntosh Turfa, 99–133. Abingdon: Routledge, 2013.